The Norfolk House was a tavern in Dedham, Massachusetts originally built in 1801 and located at 19 Court Street.  It hosted John Quincy Adams, Andrew Jackson, and the Marquis de Lafayette.

Martin Marsh
During the first few years of the 19th century, several turnpikes, including those linking Boston and Providence and Dedham and Hartford, were laid through Dedham.  Inns and taverns sprung up along the new roads as more than 600 coaches would pass through Dedham each day on their way to Boston or Providence.  As many as 40 coaches passed through town every day, and Dedham was the first stop on the way to Providence, or the last stop on the way to Boston.

In 1802, a local mason named Martin Marsh built his brick home at what is today 19 Court Street and was then right on one of the new turnpikes.  He saw the traffic flowing daily past his house and quickly turned his home into a tavern.  He obtained a 999-year lease from First Church for the land on June 15, 1801, for $30 a year. His establishment, the Norfolk House, like the other inns and taverns in Dedham at that time, were bustling with the arrival of both the turnpikes and the courts.

The tavern was affiliated with the Tremont Stagecoach Line, which Marsh founded in 1814 with John Ellis. It left Dedham at 7 a.m. in the summer at 8:30 in the winter, Monday through Saturday, and stopped at Mr. Davenport's Tavern on Elm St., Boston. The afternoon trip left at 4:00. The Boston terminal later changed to Clark's Tavern in Brattle Square, Boston, later that year. A one way fare was 62.5 cents. It had a fierce competition with the nearby Phoenix Hotel's Citizen Stagecoach Line.

The original portico of the house was the site of the first recorded traffic accident in Dedham. A runaway carriage crashed into the corner post and broke it.  The Norfolk House was also the site where "on June 4, 1810, in an expression of public outrage, a number of Dedham citizens assembled" and founded the Society in Dedham for Apprehending Horse Thieves. The Society ment there annually for a number of years. Today the "Society is the oldest continually existing horse thief apprehending organization in the United States, and one of Dedham's most venerable social organizations." It also hosted a number of political conventions, weddings, and other gatherings, as well as the annual meetings of the various fire engine and militia companies.

The Dedham Bank also held meetings there from 1814 to 1849. Citizens could also pay their taxes at the tavern. After a new Norfolk County Jail was built in 1817, the tools used in the project were auctioned off at the tavern.

The Norfolk House was the meeting place of the Constellation Lodge of Freemasons for many years. Both Mason, and his successors, Alden and Gragg, were Masons. A new Masonic Lodge was built in 1829.

Gray and Alden
Though he wanted to sell it as early as 1814, Marsh maintained the tavern until 1818, and then sold it to Moses Gray and Francis Alden. It was this partnership that hosted President Andrew Jackson for lunch as he and his entourage passed through town in 1832.  The Norfolk House was also a hotbed for Republican politics in its day. It competed with the Democratic Phoenix House. The proprietors of the two establishments generally stayed away from each other but "every once in a while they slipped and then there would be a short burst of newspaper venom."

In 1820, three bays were added to the north of the building.  In addition, another bay and a large ell were added to the rear, and the building gained a third story. The building had a stable and sheds associated with it.

For a time it was owned by Gray alone, and then by Alden alone.

Martin Bates
In 1840, Martin Bates purchased the property.  He sometimes kept a moose behind the property, and charged admission to see it.

The railroad came to Dedham in 1836, and stagecoach traffic dwindled until it stopped all together in 1842.  The temperance movement also put pressure on taverns, and the house ceased to be a tavern in 1866.  By this time, and especially after an incident in which a group of Irish immigrants from Dedham and Roxbury got drunk and four people were stabbed, Bates was ready to sell the property.

Bates tried to sell it to the Town of Dedham, but the Town was not interested.  In a fit of spite, Bates then sold it to the Sisters of Charity to open St. Mary's School and Asylum, an orphanage and school for girls. The school closed in the late 1870s, and then became a flop house, warehouse, and "third rate office building" which, at one point, housed the offices of an "independent clairvoyant and medical reformer." During this time the building fell into disrepair.

Notes

References

Works cited

Houses completed in 1801
Buildings and structures in Dedham, Massachusetts
Houses in Norfolk County, Massachusetts
History of Dedham, Massachusetts